Ted or Theodore Green(e) may refer to:

 Ted Greene (1946-2005),  American fingerstyle jazz guitarist
 Ted Greene (American football), American football player
Ted Green (born 1940),  Canadian professional ice hockey coach and player
Theodore F. Green (1867-1966), American politician

See also
Edward Greene (disambiguation)